The Mortuary Temple of Seti I is the memorial temple (or mortuary temple) of the New Kingdom Pharaoh Seti I. It is located in the Theban Necropolis in Upper Egypt, across the River Nile from the modern city of Luxor (Thebes). The edifice is situated near the town of Qurna.

Construction
The temple seems to have been constructed toward the end of the reign of Seti, and may have been completed by his son Ramesses the Great after his death. One of the chambers contains a shrine dedicated to Seti's father Ramesses I. The ruler reigned a little under two years, and did not construct a mortuary temple for himself.

Current condition

The entire court and any pylons associated with the site are now in ruins, and much of the eastern part of the complex is buried under the modern town of Qurna.

References

Theban Necropolis
Seti I